Riku Olavi Riski (born 16 August 1989) is a Finnish footballer who plays for the Finnish club HJK Helsinki. He has previously played for TPS Turku in Finland, Widzew Łódź in Poland, Hønefoss BK, Rosenborg BK and Odds BK in Norway, and has also had loan spells with Örebro SK and IFK Göteborg in Sweden and Dundee United in Scotland. He has also represented Finland in international football.

Career

Club
Riski was born in Masku on 16 August 1989. He played his first game for Turun Palloseura in the Veikkausliiga when he was only 16 years old. In January 2011, the midfielder joined Polish club Widzew Łódź on three-and-a-half year contract.

On 30 August 2011, he was loaned for six months to Örebro SK in Sweden. On 12 September Riski made his Allsvenskan debut playing 90 minutes and scoring once against AIK. On 5 January 2012, he signed a three-year contract with freshly promoted Hønefoss BK.

On 30 December 2013, he signed a four-year contract with Norwegian side Rosenborg BK.

On 5 August 2015, he was loaned for five months to IFK Göteborg in Sweden.

On 8 January 2016, Riski signed a loan deal with Scottish Premiership side Dundee United.

Riski returned to Turun Palloseura on 3 February 2023, signing a 2+1 year deal.

International
He was a member of Finland national under-21 football team during the 2011 Euro U21 qualifying. He made his senior national team debut on 9 February 2011 against Belgium. He scored a goal against Turkey B team in a 0−1 away win on 25 March 2011.

Riski turned down a call-up to the Finland squad for a winter training camp and two friendly matches in Qatar during January 2019, citing "ethical reasons and the values I wanted to act upon".

Personal life
He is the older brother of Roope Riski, who also plays for HJK.

Career statistics

Club

International

International goals

Honours

Individual
Veikkausliiga Team of the Year: 2020, 2021

References

External links
 
 
 Guardian's Stats Centre

1989 births
Living people
Association football forwards
Association football wingers
Finnish footballers
Finland international footballers
Maskun Palloseura players
Turun Palloseura footballers
Widzew Łódź players
Örebro SK players
IFK Göteborg players
Hønefoss BK players
Rosenborg BK players
Odds BK players
Helsingin Jalkapalloklubi players
Veikkausliiga players
Ekstraklasa players
Allsvenskan players
Eliteserien players
Finnish expatriate footballers
Expatriate footballers in Poland
Expatriate footballers in Sweden
Expatriate footballers in Norway
Finnish expatriate sportspeople in Poland
Finnish expatriate sportspeople in Sweden
Finnish expatriate sportspeople in Norway
Dundee United F.C. players
Expatriate footballers in Scotland
Finnish expatriate sportspeople in Scotland
People from Masku
Sportspeople from Southwest Finland